is a district divided between Sorachi and Kamikawa Subprefectures, Hokkaido, Japan.

As of 2004, the district has an estimated population of 18,996 and a density of 12.70 persons per km2. The total area is 1,495.78 km2.

Towns and villages

Kamikawa Subprefecture
Horokanai

Sorachi Subprefecture
Chippubetsu
Hokuryū
Moseushi
Numata
Uryū

Changes
On April 1, 2010, Horokanai was transferred from Sorachi Subprefecture to Kamikawa Subprefecture. As such Uryū District was now also part of the latter subprefecture.

Districts in Hokkaido